Michael North is the name of:

Michael North (professor), professor of English at UCLA
Ted North (1916–1975), American actor (sometimes credited as Michael North)
Mikey North (born 1986), English actor
Mike North (born 1950s), TV presenter